Francis of Assisi is a 1961 DeLuxe CinemaScope movie directed by Michael Curtiz, based on the 1958 novel The Joyful Beggar by Louis de Wohl. It was shot entirely in Italy. The film was a box-office loss. It starred Bradford Dillman in one of his few sympathetic leading film roles (he usually played a villainous character onscreen).

Two years after the release of Francis of Assisi, Dolores Hart, the 24-year-old actress who plays St. Clare in the film, became a Catholic nun at the Benedictine Abbey of Regina Laudis in Bethlehem, Connecticut.

Plot
Francis Bernardone (Bradford Dillman) is the son of a wealthy cloth merchant in Assisi. He joins a military expedition, but deserts when an inner voice commands it. He gives up all his worldly goods to dedicate himself to God. Clare (Dolores Hart) is a young aristocratic woman who, according to the film, is so taken with St. Francis that she leaves her family and becomes a nun. This follows a lengthy rivalry between Francis and the warrior Count Paolo for Clare's affections and values; Clare follows a monastic life instead of marrying Paolo, but Francis and Paolo are eventually reconciled. 

By this time (1212 A.D.), St. Francis has a well-established reputation for his vows of poverty. The movie goes on to note miracles (such as the appearance of the stigmata on Francis's hands and feet) and other aspects of his life, such as a visit to Sultan Al-Kamil of Egypt, up to and including his death on October 3, 1226. The funeral befitted a man loved by man and beast alike, and ended with the birds he loved doing a "flyby".

Cast
 Bradford Dillman as Francis Bernardone of Assisi 
 Dolores Hart as Clare 
 Stuart Whitman as Count Paolo of Vandria 
 Cecil Kellaway as Cardinal Hugolino 
 Eduard Franz as Pietro Bernardone 
 Athene Seyler as Aunt Buona 
 Finlay Currie as the Pope 
 Pedro Armendáriz as the Sultan
 Mervyn Johns as Brother Juniper 
 Russell Napier as Brother Elias 
 John Welsh as Canon Cattanei 
 Harold Goldblatt as Bernard 
 Edith Sharpe as Donna Pica 
 Jack Lambert as Scefi 
 Oliver Johnston as Father Livoni 
 Malcolm Keen as Bishop Guido

Reception
A. H. Weiler of The New York Times wrote that "as a motion picture dependent on the dramatic conflict and exciting incidents that surely were synonymous with the emergence of such a towering man in such tumultuous times, it is as serene and static as ancient tapestries, limp on castle walls ... There are frictions here, of course, but these are gentle affairs that are not especially memorable."

Variety wrote "The absence of sustained dramatic friction and a reluctance to grapple with conflicts and climaxes in visual terms results in an aura of absolute serenity and a characteristic of ponderous verbosity that may be true in spirit, tone and tempo to the tale of supreme devotion being told, but is unlikely to prove sufficiently palatable to modern audience tastes."

Philip K. Scheuer of the Los Angeles Times stated "The treatment is reverent and apparently unusually faithful to history, the color and CinemaScope production often eye-filling and the performances, while hardly exceptional, will hardly raise dissent. But the picture's appeal is limited decidedly to the devout and to those who would seek serene affirmation of their Christian faith. It is what I call a church film, pure and simple—ecclesiastical and eclectic."

Richard L. Coe of The Washington Post reported that "I kept regretting the firm had three million dollars to lavish on the project. The result may please those willing to settle for a saint's biography. Apart from some individual scenes of pictorial appeal, I found the attempt unimaginative and flat. There is in it none of that sense of wonder which distinguished Pierre Fresnay's memorable 'Monsieur Vincent,' a simple French essay in black and white."

Harrison's Reports gave the film a grade of "Fair" and wrote that "Catholics and those strongly interested in religious themes will be about the only ones deriving much satisfaction from this CinemaScope-Color account of the life of St. Francis. For this superficial treatment is almost devoid of action and suspense, while being too talky."

The Monthly Film Bulletin wrote "With its lepers, its desert rendezvous with a sheik and its deep-seated bitterness between the hero and his irreligious rival, this expensive slab of hagiolatry might well be described as Ben-Hur without the chariot race. As it turns out there is precious little action or dramatic friction of any kind (Piero Portalupi's camera studiously avoids every challenging incident), only a ponderously serene screenplay and a stolidly passionless cast directed without a spark of imagination by Michael Curtiz."

See also
 List of American films of 1961

References

External links
 
 
 

1961 films
20th Century Fox films
CinemaScope films
Films directed by Michael Curtiz
Films about Catholicism
Films set in the 13th century
Films set in Italy
American biographical drama films
Films shot in Italy
Films based on British novels
Religious epic films
1960s biographical drama films
Cultural depictions of Francis of Assisi
Biographical films about religious leaders
Films scored by Mario Nascimbene
1961 drama films
1960s English-language films
1960s American films